This is the list of teams participated at the Philippine Super Liga.

Women's

Member teams

NOTE: Filed indefinite leave of absence after the cancellation of the 2020 season.

Former teams

NOTE: Transferred to Premier Volleyball League.

Defunct teams

Men's

Former teams

NOTE: Transferred to Spikers' Turf.

Defunct teams

References

Philippine Super Liga